Scapteromys is a genus of South American rodents in the tribe Akodontini of family Cricetidae. Three species are known, found in northern Argentina, southern Brazil, Paraguay and Uruguay. They are as follows:
 Argentine swamp rat (Scapteromys aquaticus)
 Plateau swamp rat (Scapteromys meridionalis)
 Waterhouse's swamp rat (Scapteromys tumidus)
Species are semiaquatic, living in and near marshes and other bodies of water. They reach a body length of 15 to 20 cm and a tail length of 13–17 cm, and weigh 110-200 g. Fur color is dark gray on top and light gray on the underside. They are primarily crepuscular and nocturnal. Their diet consists mainly of insects; they also consume other invertebrates and plant material.

The three species differ in karyotype, with aquaticus having 2n = 32, tumidus 2n = 24 and meridionalis 2n = 34/36.

References 

 
Rodent genera